The Mayumbe line was a  long  gauge narrow gauge railway in the north west of the Democratic Republic of the Congo between the port of Boma and Tshela.

History
The Société des Chemins de fer vicinaux du Mayumbe (CVM) was created on July 30, 1898, to build and operate a network of railways built at a  narrow gauge in the province of Lower Congo, in the Congo Free State which became Belgian Congo then Republic of the Congo, with a planned extension to the Republic of Congo.

On 1 January 1936, the CVM was integrated with the Office des Transports Coloniaux (OTRACO).

In 1974, it was merged with the Office National des Transports (ONATRA). The line was dismantled in 1984 under Mobutu Sese Seko, along with the local industry.

Line
Boma - Lukula - Tshela (140 km)
 Boma (Plateau) - Bangu (8 km), opening May 7, 1899
 Bangu - Kisundi (35 km), opening on January 1, 1900
 Kisundi - Lukula (35 km), opening December 31, 1901
 Lukula - Tshela (60 km), opening 31 December 1912, extension opened by the State
In 1932, the Boma Lukula section was converted to  narrow gauge, the section from Lukula to Tshela in 1938.

Locomotives
 No. 1-8, type 020T, delivered in 1898-9 by Saint Léonard Liège
 No. 1A-4A, type Garratt 020-020, delivered in 1911 by Saint Léonard Liège
 No. 1B-2B, type Garratt 020-020, delivered in 1919 by Saint Leonard in Liege
 No. 3B-6B, type Garratt 020-020, delivered in 1921 by Saint Leonard in Liege
 No. 7B-11B, type Garratt 020-020, delivered in 1924 by Saint Leonard in Liege
 No. 1C-4C, type Garratt 020-020, delivered in 1926 by Saint Leonard in Liege
 No. 1E, type Garratt 020-020, delivered in 1927 by Saint Leonard in Liege

Gallery

References

600 mm gauge railways in the Democratic Republic of the Congo
2 ft gauge railways in the Democratic Republic of the Congo
Railway lines opened in 1898
Railway lines closed in 1984
1898 establishments in the Congo Free State
Railway lines in the Democratic Republic of the Congo